The Zlatoust constituency (No.193) is a Russian legislative constituency in Chelyabinsk Oblast. The constituency covers historical Mountain-Industrial Zone in northwestern Chelyabinsk Oblast.

Members elected

Election results

1993

|-
! colspan=2 style="background-color:#E9E9E9;text-align:left;vertical-align:top;" |Candidate
! style="background-color:#E9E9E9;text-align:left;vertical-align:top;" |Party
! style="background-color:#E9E9E9;text-align:right;" |Votes
! style="background-color:#E9E9E9;text-align:right;" |%
|-
|style="background-color:"|
|align=left|Vladimir Grigoriadi
|align=left|Kedr
|
|27.14%
|-
|style="background-color:"|
|align=left|Rais Atnagulov
|align=left|Independent
| -
|23.30%
|-
| colspan="5" style="background-color:#E9E9E9;"|
|- style="font-weight:bold"
| colspan="3" style="text-align:left;" | Total
| 
| 100%
|-
| colspan="5" style="background-color:#E9E9E9;"|
|- style="font-weight:bold"
| colspan="4" |Source:
|
|}

1995

|-
! colspan=2 style="background-color:#E9E9E9;text-align:left;vertical-align:top;" |Candidate
! style="background-color:#E9E9E9;text-align:left;vertical-align:top;" |Party
! style="background-color:#E9E9E9;text-align:right;" |Votes
! style="background-color:#E9E9E9;text-align:right;" |%
|-
|style="background-color:#2C299A"|
|align=left|Vladimir Grigoriadi (incumbent)
|align=left|Congress of Russian Communities
|
|18.76%
|-
|style="background-color:"|
|align=left|Zhakslyk Altynbayev
|align=left|Our Home – Russia
|
|18.08%
|-
|style="background-color:"|
|align=left|Boris Vydrin
|align=left|Communist Party
|
|16.43%
|-
|style="background-color:"|
|align=left|Lev Ubozhko
|align=left|Conservative Party
|
|7.64%
|-
|style="background-color:#E98282"|
|align=left|Natalya Guseva
|align=left|Women of Russia
|
|7.33%
|-
|style="background-color:"|
|align=left|Anatoly Bokov
|align=left|Yabloko
|
|6.16%
|-
|style="background-color:"|
|align=left|Aleksandr Linev
|align=left|Liberal Democratic Party
|
|5.50%
|-
|style="background-color:"|
|align=left|Konstantin Somotov
|align=left|Independent
|
|5.29%
|-
|style="background-color:#F7C451"|
|align=left|Andrey Karpov
|align=left|Common Cause
|
|2.59%
|-
|style="background-color:"|
|align=left|Aleksandr Fedik
|align=left|Independent
|
|1.53%
|-
|style="background-color:"|
|align=left|Sergey Kostromin
|align=left|Union of Patriots
|
|1.45%
|-
|style="background-color:#1C1A0D"|
|align=left|Vasily Krutolapov
|align=left|Forward, Russia!
|
|1.24%
|-
|style="background-color:"|
|align=left|Gennady Temlyantsev
|align=left|Independent
|
|0.35%
|-
|style="background-color:#000000"|
|colspan=2 |against all
|
|5.98%
|-
| colspan="5" style="background-color:#E9E9E9;"|
|- style="font-weight:bold"
| colspan="3" style="text-align:left;" | Total
| 
| 100%
|-
| colspan="5" style="background-color:#E9E9E9;"|
|- style="font-weight:bold"
| colspan="4" |Source:
|
|}

1999

|-
! colspan=2 style="background-color:#E9E9E9;text-align:left;vertical-align:top;" |Candidate
! style="background-color:#E9E9E9;text-align:left;vertical-align:top;" |Party
! style="background-color:#E9E9E9;text-align:right;" |Votes
! style="background-color:#E9E9E9;text-align:right;" |%
|-
|style="background-color:"|
|align=left|Pyotr Svechnikov
|align=left|Communist Party
|
|27.82%
|-
|style="background-color:"|
|align=left|Aleksandr Kuznetsov
|align=left|Yabloko
|
|24.37%
|-
|style="background-color:"|
|align=left|Aleksandr Pelevin
|align=left|Independent
|
|14.03%
|-
|style="background-color:#E2CA66"|
|align=left|Vladimir Grigoriadi (incumbent)
|align=left|For Civil Dignity
|
|11.56%
|-
|style="background-color:#1042A5"|
|align=left|German Galkin
|align=left|Union of Right Forces
|
|3.23%
|-
|style="background-color:"|
|align=left|Aleksandr Linev
|align=left|Liberal Democratic Party
|
|3.11%
|-
|style="background-color:"|
|align=left|Yury Abubakirov
|align=left|Independent
|
|2.95%
|-
|style="background-color:"|
|align=left|Mikhail Lonshchakov
|align=left|Independent
|
|1.31%
|-
|style="background-color:"|
|align=left|Boris Mizrakhi
|align=left|Our Home – Russia
|
|1.00%
|-
|style="background-color:"|
|align=left|Mussa Dzugayev
|align=left|Independent
|
|0.73%
|-
|style="background-color:#000000"|
|colspan=2 |against all
|
|8.06%
|-
| colspan="5" style="background-color:#E9E9E9;"|
|- style="font-weight:bold"
| colspan="3" style="text-align:left;" | Total
| 
| 100%
|-
| colspan="5" style="background-color:#E9E9E9;"|
|- style="font-weight:bold"
| colspan="4" |Source:
|
|}

2003

|-
! colspan=2 style="background-color:#E9E9E9;text-align:left;vertical-align:top;" |Candidate
! style="background-color:#E9E9E9;text-align:left;vertical-align:top;" |Party
! style="background-color:#E9E9E9;text-align:right;" |Votes
! style="background-color:#E9E9E9;text-align:right;" |%
|-
|style="background-color:"|
|align=left|Valery Panov
|align=left|Independent
|
|28.46%
|-
|style="background-color:"|
|align=left|Aleksandr Kuznetsov
|align=left|Yabloko
|
|18.13%
|-
|style="background-color:"|
|align=left|Pyotr Svechnikov (incumbent)
|align=left|Communist Party
|
|15.93%
|-
|style="background-color:"|
|align=left|Yevgenia Belousova
|align=left|Independent
|
|13.70%
|-
|style="background-color:"|
|align=left|Aleksandr Linev
|align=left|Liberal Democratic Party
|
|5.98%
|-
|style="background-color:#00A1FF"|
|align=left|Aleksandr Makeyev
|align=left|Party of Russia's Rebirth-Russian Party of Life
|
|2.25%
|-
|style="background-color:"|
|align=left|Ivan Vavilov
|align=left|Agrarian Party
|
|2.02%
|-
|style="background-color:#7C73CC"|
|align=left|Konstantin Skvortsov
|align=left|Great Russia – Eurasian Union
|
|0.79%
|-
|style="background-color:"|
|align=left|Sergey Mossakovsky
|align=left|Independent
|
|0.41%
|-
|style="background-color:#000000"|
|colspan=2 |against all
|
|10.59%
|-
| colspan="5" style="background-color:#E9E9E9;"|
|- style="font-weight:bold"
| colspan="3" style="text-align:left;" | Total
| 
| 100%
|-
| colspan="5" style="background-color:#E9E9E9;"|
|- style="font-weight:bold"
| colspan="4" |Source:
|
|}

2016

|-
! colspan=2 style="background-color:#E9E9E9;text-align:left;vertical-align:top;" |Candidate
! style="background-color:#E9E9E9;text-align:leftt;vertical-align:top;" |Party
! style="background-color:#E9E9E9;text-align:right;" |Votes
! style="background-color:#E9E9E9;text-align:right;" |%
|-
| style="background-color: " |
|align=left|Oleg Kolesnikov
|align=left|United Russia
|
|32.44%
|-
|style="background-color:"|
|align=left|Sergey Vainshtein
|align=left|Liberal Democratic Party
|
|25.12%
|-
| style="background-color: " |
|align=left|Nikolay Pankratov
|align=left|A Just Russia
|
|11.87%
|-
|style="background-color:"|
|align=left|Ivan Nikitchuk
|align=left|Communist Party
|
|11.20%
|-
|style="background-color:"|
|align=left|Valikhan Turgumbayev
|align=left|Party of Growth
|
|6.43%
|-
|style="background-color: " |
|align=left|Natalya Tavrina
|align=left|Yabloko
|
|2.73%
|-
|style="background-color:"|
|align=left|Vasily Koshmar
|align=left|Patriots of Russia
|
|1.81%
|-
|style="background-color:"|
|align=left|Vasily Potapov
|align=left|People's Freedom Party
|
|1.48%
|-
|style="background-color:"|
|align=left|Yury Gumenyuk
|align=left|Rodina
|
|1.40%
|-
| colspan="5" style="background-color:#E9E9E9;"|
|- style="font-weight:bold"
| colspan="3" style="text-align:left;" | Total
| 
| 100%
|-
| colspan="5" style="background-color:#E9E9E9;"|
|- style="font-weight:bold"
| colspan="4" |Source:
|
|}

2021

|-
! colspan=2 style="background-color:#E9E9E9;text-align:left;vertical-align:top;" |Candidate
! style="background-color:#E9E9E9;text-align:left;vertical-align:top;" |Party
! style="background-color:#E9E9E9;text-align:right;" |Votes
! style="background-color:#E9E9E9;text-align:right;" |%
|-
|style="background-color: " |
|align=left|Oleg Kolesnikov (incumbent)
|align=left|United Russia
|
|34.75%
|-
|style="background-color:"|
|align=left|Pavel Loginov
|align=left|A Just Russia — For Truth
|
|15.74%
|-
|style="background-color:"|
|align=left|Konstantin Natsiyevsky
|align=left|Communist Party
|
|12.92%
|-
|style="background-color:"|
|align=left|Denis Lezin
|align=left|New People
|
|7.45%
|-
|style="background-color: "|
|align=left|Stepan Firstov
|align=left|Party of Pensioners
|
|6.99%
|-
|style="background-color: " |
|align=left|Mikhail Smetanin
|align=left|Communists of Russia
|
|5.76%
|-
|style="background-color:"|
|align=left|Vitaly Pashin
|align=left|Liberal Democratic Party
|
|5.57%
|-
|style="background-color:"|
|align=left|Sergey Gavryushkin
|align=left|Rodina
|
|3.09%
|-
|style="background-color: "|
|align=left|Pyotr Svechnikov
|align=left|Russian Party of Freedom and Justice
|
|1.53%
|-
| colspan="5" style="background-color:#E9E9E9;"|
|- style="font-weight:bold"
| colspan="3" style="text-align:left;" | Total
| 
| 100%
|-
| colspan="5" style="background-color:#E9E9E9;"|
|- style="font-weight:bold"
| colspan="4" |Source:
|
|}

Notes

References

Russian legislative constituencies
Politics of Chelyabinsk Oblast